Molina's grass mouse (Akodon molinae) is a species of rodent in the family Cricetidae.
It is found only in Argentina.

References

Akodon
Mammals of Argentina
Mammals described in 1968
Taxonomy articles created by Polbot